Tin(II) hydroxide, Sn(OH)2, also known as stannous hydroxide, is an inorganic compound tin(II). The only related material for which definitive information is available is the oxy hydroxide Sn6O4(OH)4, but other related materials are claimed.  They are all white solids that are insoluble in water.

Preparation and structure
Crystals of Sn6O4(OH)4 has been characterized by X-ray diffraction.  This cluster is obtained from solution of basic solutions of tin(II).  The compound consists of an octahedron of Sn centers, each face of which is capped by an oxide or a hydroxide.  The structure is reminiscent of the Mo6S8 subunit of the Chevrel phases.. The structure of pure Sn(OH)2 is not known.

Sn(OH)2 has been claimed to arise from the reaction of (CH3)3SnOH with SnCl2 in an aprotic solvent:
2 Me3SnOH + SnCl2 → Sn(OH)2 + 2 Me3SnCl
No crystallographic characterization is available on this material.

Reactions
Stannous hydroxide is easily oxidized to stannic oxide (SnO2) by air.

References

Hydroxides
Tin(II) compounds
Reducing agents